

The Elias XNBS-3 was a 1920s prototype biplane bomber built by Elias for the United States Army Air Corps.

Development
The XNBS-3 was a large biplane bomber with a steel tube fuselage and powered by two  Liberty 12A piston engines. It had a conventional landing gear with a tailskid and a crew of four. The prototype was designated XNBS-3 (XNBS=prototype night bomber short distance).  On 13 August 1924 Lieutenant John A. Macready test piloted the Elias XNBS-3 twin engine bomber for the United States Army Air Corps at McCook Field in Dayton, Ohio.  The XNBS-3 had New York to Chicago non-stop range and five machine guns for defense. It was similar to the earlier Martin NBS-1 and was no real improvement, so it was not ordered into production.

Operators

United States Army Air Corps

Specifications

See also

References

Notes

Bibliography

 

1920s United States bomber aircraft
NBS-3
Biplanes
Twin piston-engined tractor aircraft